The first duet studio album by Francissca Peter & Royston Sta Maria released in 1982.

Track listing

References

External links 
 Official Website

1982 albums
Francissca Peter albums
EMI Records albums
Malay-language albums
Vocal duet albums